Delicias, is a railway station serving the area of Arganzuela in Madrid, Spain. Is owned by Adif and operated by Renfe Operadora. The station is served by Cercanías Madrid lines C-1, C-7 and C-10.

It should not be confused with the former Delicias terminus, which currently houses the Railway Museum.  Nor should it be confused with homonymous station of Madrid Metro, as there is no direct access between the two stations.

References

Cercanías Madrid stations
Railway stations in Madrid